Liam Reilly (29 January 1955 – 1 January 2021) was an Irish singer-songwriter and a member of the group Bagatelle, formed in 1978 by drummer Walter (Wally) McConville along with bass player Ken Doyle and guitarist John O’Brien.

Career
In 1980 while recording the band's debut album, Reilly had received an offer from Gus Dudgeon (Elton John's producer, who has since died) to begin a solo career in return for leaving the other band members to their own devices.  However Reilly refused and insisted on sticking by the other members as they had done the same for him until that point.  After leaving the group in the mid-1980s he moved to Savannah, Georgia and began a solo career.  While in Savannah, he recorded an album entitled Savannah Souvenir which featured much of Reilly's keyboards and vocals and was produced by Phil Hadaway.  In 1988 he was a finalist in the Irish heats of the Eurovision Song Contest with the song "Lifeline". Reilly came back to arrive second in the event in 1990 with "Somewhere in Europe". He performed this at the Eurovision Song Contest 1990 staged in Zagreb and was placed joint second out of the 22 entries. As a composer, Reilly returned to Eurovision in Rome in 1991 where his song "Could It Be That I'm in Love", performed by Kim Jackson, was placed equal tenth.

In 1990, he co-produced an album with American Producer Phil Hadaway 'Throwing Caution to the Wind' (Polydor 847535-4) recorded at Westland Studios Dublin and Reeltime Recording, Savannah, Georgia, USA.  All songs were written by Liam Reilly except 'Georgia on My Mind' and 'Moonriver'.

Death
Per a family statement, Reilly died "suddenly but peacefully" at his home on 1 January 2021, aged 65.

References

External links
 
 

1955 births
2021 deaths
Irish male singers
Eurovision Song Contest entrants of 1990
Eurovision Song Contest entrants for Ireland
People from Dundalk